Sidi Mahrez Khelloua Mosque is a mosque in Tunis, Tunisia.

Location
This mosque is at 13 Sidi Ayed Street, in the Bab Jedid quarter of the city, south of the Medina of Tunis.

Etymology
The mosque is named for its founder Abu Mohamed Mahrez Ibn Khalaf or Sidi Mahrez, who was also known as the "Sultan of the Medina".
Khelloua is a Sufi word that refers to a place of isolation where an imam or a cheikh carries out his invocation which can last for days.

History
According to the commemorative plaque, the mosque was built by Sidi Mahrez in the 10th century.
Recently it got restored.

References

Mosques in Tunis
10th-century mosques